Lozovoye is a rural locality (a selo) and the administrative center of Lozovskoye Rural Settlement, Rovensky District, Belgorod Oblast, Russia. The population was 502 as of 2010. There are 5 streets.

Geography 
Lozovoye is located 20 km east of Rovenki (the district's administrative centre) by road. Shirokon is the nearest rural locality.

References 

Rural localities in Rovensky District, Belgorod Oblast